Vaashey Mashaa Ekee 
() is a 2016 Maldivian romantic comedy film directed by Ali Shifau. Co-produced by Mohamed Ali and Aishath Fuad Thaufeeq under Dark Rain Entertainment, the film stars Mohamed Jumayyil and Mariyam Majudha in pivotal roles. The shooting of the film took place in Malé, Hulhumalé and Villimalé.

Plot
The story revolves around 2 individuals with different ideologies. Ziyadh wants to enjoy his life and don't want any kids. Nathasha on the other hand, is a hardworking teacher who loves kids and wants have one too.

Problem arise when Natha become pregnant. Ziya's behaviour towards Natha changed after her pregnancy. Natha decided to separate from Ziya due to his lack of co-operation, and lives with her friend Inaya. Ziya realised the importance of Natha and his baby and wants Natha back in him, but Natha doesn't wanna go back to him. Ziya does everything Natha expected him to do so he can win her back. Natha accept Ziya's apology. After getting along Natha gets labour pain and gets admitted. During the delivery Ziya was with Natha in the Labour ward despite it not being allowed. Ziya happily carries his and realise the importance of a child in marriage.

Four years later, Natha and Ziya lives a happy life with their son. Natha reveals that she is pregnant again to which Ziya reacts in a negative way.

Cast 
 Mohamed Jumayyil as Ziyadh, Nathasha's husband 
 Mariyam Majudha as Nathasha, Ziyadh's wife
 Mohamed Faisal as Thobe, Ziyadh's friend & Inaya's brother 
 Ali Shazleem as Adhuham, Inaya's husband 
 Aminath Noora as Inaya, Adhuham's wife & Thobe's sister 
 Ahmed Sunie as Dr. Asif, Nathasha's gynecologist & Suzanne's husband 
 Adam Rizwee as Rex, Ziyadh & Thobe's friend
 Ahmed Shakir as Zaroon, Fubu's brother 
 Abdullah Shafiu Ibrahim as Fubu, Nathasha's ex-boyfriend & Zaroon' s brother 
 Maryz Gomez as Maryz, Thobe's girlfriend 
 Maria Teresa Pagano as Suzanne, Maryz friend & Dr. Asif's wife 
 Mohamed Naail as Kaif, Inaya & Adhuham's eldest son
 Ahmed Naavi as Zaul, Inaya & Adhuham's youngest son
 Aishath Gulfa as Dr. Aisha, Nathasha's radiologist 
 Hassan Rizvee as Office Assistant
 Hamdhan Farooq as Male Nurse

Soundtrack 
The soundtrack album of the film consists of six original tracks. The music of the album was composed by Mohamed Ikram.

Release
Initially, Vaashey Mashaa Ekee was slated to release during the month of February in 2016. However, on 9 November 2015, it was revealed that the release date of the film was postponed to 4 May 2016. After confirming the news on their official Facebook page, the film was confirmed to be releasing a month earlier. The film was premiered at Olympus on 5 April 2016. The film was premiered at different islands afterwards. It was screened at Addu City on 14 April 2016.

Accolades

References

External links
 

2016 films
2016 romantic comedy films
Maldivian romantic comedy films
Dark Rain Entertainment films
Films directed by Ali Shifau
Dhivehi-language films